Martin Bína (born 21 May 1983) is a Czech former cyclo-cross cyclist.

Major results

Cyclo-cross

2000–2001
 1st  UCI World Junior Championships
2001–2002
 1st  National Under-23 Championships
2002–2003
 1st  National Under-23 Championships
2003–2004
 2nd  UEC European Under-23 Championships
2004–2005
 1st Overall UCI Under-23 World Cup
1st Pijnacker
1st Wetzikon
 3rd  U23 European Cyclo-cross Championships
2005-2006
 Budvar Cup
2nd Plzen
3rd Česká Lípa
3rd Hlinsko
2008–2009
 1st Overall Toi Toi Cup
1st Uničov
1st Louny
1st Česká Lípa
2nd Hlinsko
3rd Holé Vrchy
 1st Grand Prix Olomouc
 2nd Velka cena skupiny CEZ
 UCI World Cup
3rd Tábor
2009–2010
 Toi Toi Cup
1st Holé Vrchy
1st Kolín
1st Mnichovo Hradiště
2nd Hlinsko
2nd Stříbro
2nd Podbořany
 1st Grand Prix Emiagency Olomouc
 3rd National Championships
 4th UCI World Championships
2012–2013
 UCI World Cup
1st Hoogerheide
 1st Overall Toi Toi Cup
1st Holé Vrchy
1st Kolín
1st Hlinsko
1st Mladá Boleslav
1st Uničov
2nd Loštice
 1st Cauberg Cyclo-cross
 1st International Cyclocross Marikovská Dolina
 1st International Cyclocross Finančné centrum
 2nd National Championships
 3rd GP Stad Eeklo
 10th UCI World Championships
2013–2014
 1st  National Championships
 BPost Bank Trophy
2nd Ronse

Road

2012
 6th Overall Okolo Jižních Čech
1st Prologue
2013
 2nd National Road Race Championships

References

External links

1983 births
Living people
Czech male cyclists
Cyclo-cross cyclists
Sportspeople from Mladá Boleslav